There have been three Minor League Baseball clubs named Alacranes de Durango (Durango Scorpions) in Mexican Baseball History.

In all its incarnations, the Alacranes have represented the city of  Durango, the capital and largest city of the Mexican state of Durango. Since classification of the minor leagues began, they have been labeled as classes C, A and AAA in a span of 12 seasons from 1956 to 1979. The name is traditional for all sports teams from Durango, as its association football club is also called the Alacranes.

Besides, Durango is known nationally and even internationally as the Land of the Scorpions (Tierra de los Alacranes), due to abundant species of scorpions on its territory, especially in the colonial areas.

Alacranes de Durango chronology

1. Served as a farm club for AAA Algodoneros del Unión Laguna
2. Served as a farm club for AAA Charros de Jalisco
3. Won Championship
4. Lost in 1st round of playoffs
5. Lost in 1st round of playoffs

Notable players

Kim Allen (1976)
Jim Bouton !(1977)
Jim Breazeale (1976)
Ted Ford (1976–1977)
Wayne Granger (1977)
Jerry Hairston (1979)
Rudy Hernández (1976)
Jeff Holly (1976)
Max León (1979)
Buck Leonard (1956)
Roberto Méndez (1976–1979)
Bill Moran (1976)
Ivan Murrell (1976)
Tom Norton (1976)
Reggie Sanders (1977)
Ray Torres (1977–1979)
Earl Williams (1979)

Sources

Further reading
Treto Cisneros, Pedro (2002). The Mexican League/La Liga Mexicana: Comprehensive Player Statistics, 1937-2001. McFarland & Company. 
 Worth, Richard (2013). Baseball Team Names: A Worldwide Dictionary, 1869–2011. McFarland & Company. 

Baseball teams in Mexico
Defunct minor league baseball teams
Defunct Mexican League teams
Defunct baseball teams in Mexico